The Eclipse Gemini project is an implementation of the OSGi enterprise framework specifications, organized by the Eclipse Foundation. It provides a modular implementation of Java EE specifications. The Gemini project  is a collection of separate subprojects, each of which is a standalone project implementing a distinct set of functionality.

External links
 Gemini - Enterprise Modules Project (official website)

Free software programmed in Java (programming language)